, also known by the stage name Asca (stylized as ASCA), is a Japanese singer and musician signed to Sacra Music. She made her debut in 2013 after becoming a finalist at the 5th Animax All-Japan Anisong Grand Prix. After focusing on her studies, she resumed her music career in late 2016. Her songs have been featured in the anime series The Pet Girl of Sakurasou, Fate/Apocrypha, Sword Art Online, and Darwin's Game.

Biography

Early life
Ōkura was born in Aichi Prefecture on September 5, 1996. She had aspired to become a musician since she was in elementary school, at which time she also become interested in anime music. She became interested in singing after listening to the song "I believe" by Ayaka, and songs by BoA and Dreams Come True. During her second year in junior high school, her older sister, who had begun taking music lessons, encouraged her to do the same. Afterwards, she started playing in a band, with herself on vocals and her sisters playing instruments.

Career
At the encouragement of her music teacher, she decided to audition for the 5th Animax All-Japan Anisong Grand Prix in 2011. She became a finalist in the contest, which was eventually won by Konomi Suzuki. Although she did not win the contest, as a finalist, Ōkura was offered a one-year contract with music label Media Factory. After a year had passed and as the contract was about to expire, it was decided that she would make her music debut. She released her first single  on March 11, 2013; the title song is used as the second ending theme to the anime television series The Pet Girl of Sakurasou. After the release of the single, she put her career on hold to focus on her high school studies.

After she graduated from high school, Ōkura resumed her music career in 2016. Her first post-comeback release was the mini-album Days, which was released digitally on December 21, 2016. The following year, she moved to the record label Sacra Music and began using the stage name Asca. Her next release was the song "Rust", which was included in the August 2017 issue of LisAni magazine. Her second single "Koe" was released digitally on November 12, 2017 and received a physical release on November 22, 2017; the title track is used as the second ending theme to the anime television series Fate/Apocrypha. 

Her third single "Pledge" was released digitally on February 16, 2018 and received a physical release on February 21, 2018; the song is used as the ending theme of anime Record of Grancrest War  Her fourth single  was released digitally on May 4, 2018 and received a physical release on May 9, 2018; the song is used as the second opening theme of anime Record of Grancrest War She released three collaborated singles  with Ayasa,  with Kanon Wakeshima, and "Suspected, Confused and Action" with Boku no Lyric no Boyomi digitally on September 24, 2018, October 29, 2018, and November 30, 2018, respectively.

Her fifth single "Resister" was released digitally on January 13, 2019 and received a physical release on February 27, 2019; the song "Resister" is used as the second opening theme of anime Sword Art Online: Alicization, while the song "Mirage" is used as the theme song of VR game Tokyo Chronos. ASCA is featured on Hiroyuki Sawano's song "Unti-L", under the name "SawanoHiroyuki[nZk]:ASCA"; the song is feature on Hiroyuki Sawano album "R∃/MEMBER". 

Her sixth single "Rust/Hibari/Kōbō" was released on September 4, 2019. "Hibari" was released digitally on July 14, 2019, and is used as the ending theme to the anime series The Case Files of Lord El-Melloi II, while "Kōbō" is used as the insert song of VR game Tokyo Chronos. She was released her first album titled  on November 6, 2019. The album included her new song  that was used as the opening theme song of game Sword Art Online: Alicization Rising Steel 

Her seventh single "Chain" was released digitally on January 18, 2020 and received a physical release on February 26, 2020; the title track is used as the opening theme to anime series Darwin's Game. She collaborated with Takanori Nishikawa in performing the song  that was released on May 27, 2020; the song is used as the opening theme of the anime series White Cat Project: Zero Chronicle.

Her eighth single "Howling" was released digitally on October 4, 2020, and was released November 4, 2020; the title track is used as the opening theme to the second season of anime series The Irregular at Magic High School. The single itself will include Garnidelia's second single "Grilletto," which was used as the second opening of the first season of the same anime.

Discography

As Asuka Ōkura

Mini albums

Singles

As ASCA

Albums

Extended plays (EP)

Singles

Collaboration singles

Guest appearances

Digital singles

Notes

References

External links

 

21st-century Japanese singers
Anime musicians
Living people
Japanese women pop singers
Musicians from Aichi Prefecture
Sacra Music artists
Sony Music Entertainment Japan artists
1996 births
21st-century Japanese women singers